Dar Balma is an old palace in the medina of Tunis.

Location 

The palace is located in the Sidi Bou Khrissan Street.

History 
An old Andalusian family built the palace at the end of the 16th century or at the beginning of the 17th century.

The first plank of Victor Valensi's book L'Habitation tunisienne represents the door of Dar Balma.

Architecture

References

External links 

 

Balma